The Pear Lake Ski Hut (also known as Pear Lake Winter Hut) is a mountain hut in Sequoia National Park, California, listed on the National Register of Historic Places. Built in Sequoia National Park by the Civilian Conservation Corps from 1939–41 using local Sierra granite and timber materials, the hut is an example of the National Park Service Rustic style, using rough masonry and a log roof structure.

 
It has been said to be "one of the most environmentally successful alpine structures ever designed by the NPS".

The Pear Lake Ski Hut is open to the public in the winter between December and April and advanced reservations are required. The hut sleeps up to ten guests, has a separate quarters upstairs for a hut keeper and is heated by a wood pellet stove. In addition to serving as a wintertime ski hut, the structure serves as a Ranger Station for the busy Pear Lake Basin during summer months.

References

Park buildings and structures on the National Register of Historic Places in California
Buildings and structures completed in 1939
National Park Service rustic in Sequoia National Park
National Register of Historic Places in Sequoia National Park
Civilian Conservation Corps in California
Huts in the United States
1939 establishments in California